Ann Höling (1925–2005) was a German stage, film and television actress.

Selected filmography
 Chemistry and Love (1948)
 Und wieder 48 (1948)
 Anonymous Letters (1949)
 Unknown Sender (1950)
 Not Without Gisela (1951)
 Stips (1951)
 Big City Secret (1952)

References

Bibliography
 Eva Orbanz. Wolfgang Staudte. Spiess, 1977.

External links

1925 births
2005 deaths
German stage actresses
German film actresses
German television actresses